Mark Arnott (born June 15, 1950) is an American actor and martial artist. He is best known for his recurring role as Mark on the NBC television show Cheers, and as Jeff Andrews in Return of the Secaucus 7, John Sayles' debut film as a director. He did thirty years of other TV shows, playing in Joan of Arcadia, The Bernie Mac Show, NYPD Blue, soap operas, Mickey Spillane's Mike Hammer and other movies of the week.

Life and work
Mark Arnott was born in Chicago, the son of copy editor Martha Adelade Arnott (née Wood) and psychologist George Peter Arnott. He has one brother, Michael.

He attended Dartmouth College in New Hampshire as a member of the class of 1972, but took some time off to travel the country in the late 1960s and build two Harlequin Dinner Theaters, one in Rockville, Maryland and one in Atlanta, before graduating with the class of 1975 Dartmouth gave him a Marcus Heiman Award which grant enabled him to study with Stella Adler in New York City.

His earliest recorded film appearance was as Jeff in Return of the Secaucus 7. His first Equity role was as Quasimodo in The Hunchback of Notre Dame in 1978 at Joe Papp's Public Theater in New York. He appeared on and off Broadway and in regional theaters, doing the first American production of Simon Gray's The Common Pursuit, creating the role of Peter in the first two productions of Craig Lucas's Prelude to a Kiss, and doing the American premier of Alan Ayckbourn's A Small Family Business.

Personal life
In 1987 he married British actress Jane Carr who, after touring with the RSC's production of The Life and Adventures of Nicholas Nickleby relocated to Los Angeles. They divorced in 1995. In 2009, he remarried, to Melissa Mae Chase.

In 2009, he published a series of instructional books on American Kenpo Karate. A 5th Degree Black Belt, he presently teaches and writes at Arnott Kenpo in Pasadena, California.

Since opening, his dojo has been consistently ranked as the best martial arts dojo in Pasadena.

References

External links

1950 births
Living people
American male television actors
American male karateka
American Kenpo practitioners
Male actors from Chicago